Major-General Cecil Percival Heywood,  (17 May 1880 – 20 October 1936) was a British Army officer who commanded 3rd Division.

Military career
Born the second son of Sir Arthur Heywood, 3rd Baronet, Heywood was commissioned into the Coldstream Guards as a second-lieutenant on 12 August 1899. He fought in the Second Boer War, leaving Southampton for South Africa on the SS Canada in early February 1900. Following the war, he became Adjutant of the 2nd Battalion Coldstream Guards in 1904 before undertaking a tour with the Egyptian Army which involved him in operations in Southern Kurdufan in Sudan in 1908. He served in the First World War as a General Staff Officer before becoming Commander of 3rd Guards Brigade in 1918. He was appointed Commander of the Coldstream Guards and Regimental District in 1927, Director of Military Training in India in 1930 and Director of Staff Duties at the War Office in 1934. He was briefly General Officer Commanding 3rd Division in 1936 before retiring.

He is buried in All Saint's Churchyard at Denstone in Staffordshire.

Family
In 1917 he married Margaret Vere Kerr; they had a son and a daughter.

References

1880 births
1936 deaths
Burials in Staffordshire
British Army major generals
Coldstream Guards officers
Companions of the Order of the Bath
Companions of the Order of St Michael and St George
Companions of the Distinguished Service Order
Cecil
People from the Borough of East Staffordshire
Younger sons of baronets
British Army generals of World War I
Military personnel from Derbyshire
People from Duffield